Jacob Hauser was an American poet.

His work appeared in Poetry.
He was a 1936 Guggenheim Fellow.
In 1948, he mimeographed poems, which he gave away.

He criticed Modernist literature as

Works
Dark metropolis, B.C. Hagglund, 1932 
Diversity of darkness, 1933
City pastorals, Hagglund Press, 1940 
Future harvest: Poems, 1943
Man and nature, 1946
Solo: the one man poetry magazine, The Author, 1956
Valentine for Venus: a rococo sonnet-sequence, J. Hauser, 1963 
Walt Whitman: a biographical poem, 1966
Cast of characters: Poems, 1967
Key of beauty: a suite of impressionistic poems, 1967
Proserpina: House of dawn, 1967
Green & golden rhyme: sonnets, Hub Publications, 1977,  
Selected works, Hub Publications, 1977,

References

American male poets
Year of birth unknown
Year of death unknown